Reconstruction Time: The Best of iiO Remixed is a 2007 release by the group iiO. As the title implies, the album is a collection of remixes of the group's singles as well as a few other songs from the album Poetica.

Track listing

IiO albums
2007 remix albums